The Molise regional election of 1990 took place on 6 and 7 May 1990.

Events
Christian Democracy was by far the largest party, gaining more than four times the share of vote of the Italian Communist Party, which came distantly second.

After the election Christian Democrat Enrico Santoro was elected President of the Region. In 1992 Santoro was replaced by fellow Christian Democrat Luigi Di Bartolomeo and later by Giovanni Di Giandomenico.

Results

Source: Ministry of the Interior

Elections in Molise
1990 elections in Italy
May 1990 events in Europe